Chronica Gallica may refer to:
Chronica Gallica of 452
Chronica Gallica of 511